The 2017–18 season was Sunderland's 139th season in existence, and their first season in the Championship since 2006, after relegation from the Premier League in the previous season. Along with competing in the Championship, the club also participated in the FA Cup and EFL Cup. The season covered the period from 1 July 2017 to 30 June 2018.

Simon Grayson began the season as Sunderland manager, following the departure of David Moyes in May 2017. However, he did not complete the full season, instead being sacked towards the end of October after only one win in his first fifteen league matches saw Sunderland rooted to the bottom of the table. He was replaced by former Wales manager Chris Coleman.

Sunderland suffered a second successive relegation on 21 April 2018, following a 1–2 home defeat to fellow struggling side Burton Albion, after they had led the match 1–0. Results elsewhere meant that the club would compete in League One in the following season.

The events of the season formed the backdrop to the first series of the documentary programme Sunderland 'Til I Die, which was released on Netflix on 14 December 2018.

First team squad 
Ages are as of 4 August 2017.

New contracts

Transfers and loans

Transfers in

Loans in

Transfers out

Loans out

Pre-season friendlies
Sunderland announced eight pre-season friendlies against Bury, Hibernian, Livingston, Bradford City, Scunthorpe United, St Johnstone, Celtic and Hartlepool United.

Competitions

Championship

League table

Result summary

Results by matchday

Matches

The fixtures for the 2017–18 season were released on 21 June 2017.

FA Cup
In the FA Cup, Sunderland entered the competition in the third round and were drawn away to Middlesbrough.

EFL Cup
On 16 June 2017, Sunderland were drawn away to Bury in the first round. A trip to Carlisle United was announced for the second round. A third away trip in the competition against Everton was drawn for the third round.

Squad statistics

Top scorers
The list is sorted by league goals and then shirt number when total goals are equal.
 = Player left club mid-season

Last updated on 30 May 2018.

Appearances and goals

Last updated on 7 May 2018.

|-
|colspan="14"|Players who have played for Sunderland this season but are currently out on loan:

|-
|colspan="14"|Players who have played for Sunderland this season but have left the club:

|-
|}

Disciplinary record

References

Sunderland
Sunderland A.F.C. seasons